Hymenogyne is a genus of flowering plants belonging to the family Aizoaceae.

It is native to South Africa.

Species:

Hymenogyne conica 
Hymenogyne glabra

References

Aizoaceae
Aizoaceae genera